Neyyattinkara Vasudevan (1940–13 May 2008) was a Carnatic music vocalist from Kerala in south India. The Padmasree-winning Carnatic vocalist and disciple of Semmangudi Srinivasa Iyer and Ramnad Krishnan, he combined tradition and innovation in his widely acclaimed career. Vasudevan is famous as being one of the first from the Dalit community to excel in the field which was previously the preserve of the upper castes.

Biography 
Vasudevan born to a Dalit family, in a village near Neyyattinkara in southern Travancore. He did his formal music studies from the Swati Tirunal Music College, Thiruvananthapuram, chiefly under Semmangudi Srinivasa Iyer. He also did advanced studies under Ramnad Krishnan. He passed Ganabhushanam in 1960 and Sangeetha Vidwan in 1962.

He worked as assistant professor at the RLV College of Music, Thrippunithura, for nearly a decade before joining All India Radio as an A-grade staff vocalist in 1974. He retired in 2000 and was later ranked 'A Top', the highest honour given by AIR to classical musicians.

He died on 13 May 2008 in Thiruvananthapuram aged 68.

Awards 
 Padma Shri in 2004
 Swati Puraskaram in 2006
 Kerala Sangeetha Nataka Akademi Fellowship in 1989
 Kerala Sangeetha Nataka Akademi Award in 1981
 Sangeet Natak Akademi Award in 1970

Movies
He has also sung for some Malayalam movies.

References

1940 births
2008 deaths
Male Carnatic singers
Carnatic singers
Indian male playback singers
Recipients of the Padma Shri in arts
20th-century Indian male classical singers
Recipients of the Sangeet Natak Akademi Award
People from Thiruvananthapuram district
Singers from Kerala
Malayali people
Malayalam playback singers
Film musicians from Kerala
Recipients of the Kerala Sangeetha Nataka Akademi Fellowship
Recipients of the Kerala Sangeetha Nataka Akademi Award